Kurdyumov is a surname, and may refer to:

Aleksandr Kurdyumov (b. 1967), Russian member of the State Duma
Andrei Kurdyumov (born 1972), Kazakhstani footballer
Georgii Kurdyumov (1902–1996), Soviet metallurgist and physicist
Sergei P. Kurdyumov (1928–2004), Russian specialist in mathematics and physics
Vladimir Kurdyumov (1895–1970), Soviet Lieutenant General in 1940

Russian-language surnames